Simon Bestwick (born 1974) is an English author of British contemporary horror.

Biography 
Bestwick attended the University of Salford which he graduated from in 1996 with a 2:1 degree in Media and Performance.

Writer Ramsey Campbell has described Bestwick, along with Gary McMahon, Alison Littlewood and Joel Lane, as part of a class of contemporary British writers developing a “consciously political form of horror fiction, using the genre to examine and symbolise Thatcher’s Britain and the country’s subsequent decades”.

His short stories have been reprinted in Best Horror of the Year #1 'The Narrows', Best Horror of the Year #4 'Dermot' and 'The Moraine', Best British Fantasy 2013 'Dermot',  and his short story ‘Below’ is due to be reprinted in Best Horror of the Year # 12 (September 2020).

Awards and honours 

 2009 – British Fantasy Award nomination for best novella for “The Narrows”
 2012 – British Fantasy Award nomination for best short story for “Dermot”
 2019 – British Fantasy Award nomination for best horror novel for “Wolf's Hill”
 2019 – British Fantasy Award nomination for best novella for “Breakwater”

Selected works

Books 

 Power of the Dog: Precinct 13 Publications, 1998.
 Tide Of Souls: Abaddon Books, 2009. 
 The Faceless: Solaris, 2012. 
 Let's Drink To The Dead: Solaris, 2012. 
 The Condemned: Gray Friar Press, 2013. 
 Hell's Ditch:  Snowbooks, 2015. 
 Devil's Highway:  Snowbooks, 2016. 
 The Feast of All Souls: Solaris, 2016. 
 Angels Of The Silences: Omnium Gatherum Media, 2016. 
 Wolf's Hill: Snowbooks, 2018. 
 Breakwater: Tor, 2018.

Collections 

 A Hazy Shade Of Winter: Ash-Tree Press, 2004. 
 Pictures Of The Dark: Gray Friar Press, 2009. 
 And Cannot Come Again: Tales of Childhood, Regret, and Innocence Lost: ChiZine, 2019.   (Out of Print), and reprinted by Horrific Tales, 2020.

As editor 

 Oktobyr '98:: Precinct 13 Publications, 1998.

References 

1974 births
Living people
English horror writers
21st-century British novelists
21st-century British short story writers
British male novelists
British male short story writers
21st-century English novelists
Alumni of the University of Salford